
Year 214 BC was a year of the pre-Julian Roman calendar. At the time it was known as the Year of the Consulship of Verrucosus and Marcellus (or, less frequently, year 540 Ab urbe condita). The denomination 214 BC for this year has been used since the early medieval period, when the Anno Domini calendar era became the prevalent method in Europe for naming years.

Events 
 By place 

 Carthage 
 Carthage persuades Syracuse to revolt against Rome and ally itself with Carthage instead.

 Roman Republic 
Roman legions led by Tiberius Sempronius Gracchus defeat Hanno's Carthaginian forces in a battle near Beneventum, thus denying Hannibal much needed reinforcements.
 The Roman general, Marcus Claudius Marcellus, who is in Sicily at the time of the revolt of Syracuse, leads an army which storms Leontini and besieges Syracuse. With the help of Archimedes' ideas and inventions, the Syracusans repel his attacks by sea.
 The censors Publius Furius Philus and Marcus Atilius Regulus condemn and degrade (i.e. cause to lose rank in Roman society and politics) two groups of Romans of high rank, including senators and equestrians. The first group are those Roman officers captured by Hannibal's forces in the Battle of Cannae who have come as Carthaginian hostages to Rome to plead for their ransom (and those of their fellow prisoners), and who then refuse to return to Carthaginian captivity when the Senate refuses to ransom any prisoners. The second group are those Romans who have advocated surrender to Carthage after the Battle of Cannae, or who have made plans to flee Rome and offer their services in Greece, Egypt, or Asia Minor.

 Greece 
 Philip V of Macedon attempts an invasion of Illyria by sea with a fleet of 120 craft. He captures Oricum and, sailing up the Aous (modern Vjosë) river, he besieges Apollonia.
 Upon receiving word from Oricum of Philip V's actions in Illyria, Roman propraetor Marcus Valerius Laevinus crosses the Adriatic with his fleet and army. Landing at Oricum, Laevinus is able to retake the town with little fighting.
 Laevinus sends 2,000 men under the command of Quintus Naevius Crista, to Apollonia. Catching Philip's forces by surprise, Quintus Naevius Crista attacks and routs their camp. Philip V is able to escape back to Macedonia, after burning his fleet and leaving many thousands of his men dead or as prisoners of the Romans.

 China 
 Panyu (present-day Guangzhou, or Canton) is established as a city.
 Qin Shi Huang orders general Ren Xiao (任囂), commanding 200,000 troops, to conquer the kingdoms in present-day northern Vietnam.
 Qin Shi Huang orders the construction of Lingqu, the oldest contour canal.
 The Qin armies under Meng Tian campaign against the Xiongnu and other northern peoples and expand their territories along the north basin of the Yellow River. They subjugate the Luliang region, drive back the Xiongnu tribes to the northwest of the Ordos Plateau, and seize Gaoque, Mt. Tao and Beijia.

Deaths 
 Demetrius of Pharos, Illyrian ruler
 Hieronymus, tyrant of Syracuse (b. 231 BC)

References